The 1957 Wisconsin Badgers football team represented the University of Wisconsin in the 1957 Big Ten Conference football season.

Schedule

Team players in the 1958 NFL Draft

References

Further reading
 Haney, Richard Carlton. "Canceled Due to Racism: The Wisconsin Badger Football Games against Louisiana State in 1957 and 1958". Wisconsin Magazine of History, vol. 92, no. 1 (Autumn 2008): 44-53.

Wisconsin
Wisconsin Badgers football seasons
Wisconsin Badgers football